Santa Clara Municipality is one of the 39 municipalities of Durango, in north-western Mexico. The municipal seat lies at Santa Clara. The municipality covers an area of 1004.2 km².

As of 2010, the municipality had a total population of 7,003, up from 6,437 as of 2005.

As of 2010, the town of Santa Clara had a population of 4,061. Other than the town of Santa Clara, the municipality had 45 localities, none of which had a population over 1,000.

References

Municipalities of Durango